Patricia McBride (born August 23, 1942 in Teaneck, New Jersey) is a ballerina who spent nearly 30 years dancing with the New York City Ballet. McBride joined the New York City Ballet in 1959. She became a principal in 1961, becoming the company's youngest principal. She danced with the company for 30 years, including roles created for her by choreographers George Balanchine and Jerome Robbins.

New York City Ballet career
In the 30 years she spent dancing with the company she had numerous roles created for her by George Balanchine such as: Hermia in A Midsummer Night's Dream; Tarantella; Colombine in Harlequinade; the ballerina role in the Intermezzo of the Brahms–Schoenberg Quartet; Rubies; Who Cares? ("The Man I Love" pas de deux and "Fascinatin' Rhythm" solo); Divertimento from Le Baiser de la Fée; Swanilda in Coppélia; Pavane; the paper ballerina in The Steadfast Tin Soldier; the Pearly Queen in Union Jack and the "Voices of Spring" section of Vienna Waltzes.

Jerome Robbins created roles for McBride in Dances at a Gathering (pink), In the Night (third nocturne), The Goldberg Variations, The Four Seasons (fall) and Opus 19/The Dreamer, among other ballets.

In 1979, she danced in Le Bourgeois Gentilhomme, a ballet based on the 1670 play by Molière. Her role was minor, and danced well, in contrast to that of Rudolf Nureyev and Jean‐Pierre Bonnefoux. The dance had been first choreographed by Balanchine, then picked up by Jerome Robbins.

McBride was featured in the documentary film A Portrait of Giselle.

Honors
McBride was honored with a special performance of the City Ballet on June 4, 1989 at the New York State Theater at New York City's Lincoln Center on her retirement.

McBride was recognized on December 7, 2014, as a Kennedy Center Honors recipient.

Charlotte Ballet
McBride is the Associate Artistic Director and Master Teacher of Charlotte Ballet.

Personal life
She, her husband Jean-Pierre Bonnefoux, also a dancer and teacher of dance, and two children reside in Charlotte, North Carolina.

References

External links 

 Ballerina's award-winning, groundbreaking career, CBS This Morning

Living people
American ballerinas
People from Teaneck, New Jersey
New York City Ballet principal dancers
1942 births
Prima ballerinas
School of American Ballet alumni
Dance in North Carolina
Kennedy Center honorees